A polacca (or polacre) is a type of seventeenth- to nineteenth-century sailing vessel, similar to the xebec. The name is the feminine of "Polish" in the Italian language. The polacca was frequently seen in the Mediterranean. It had two or three single-pole masts, the three-masted vessels often with a lateen hoisted on the foremast (which was slanted forward to accommodate the large lateen yard) and a gaff or lateen on the mizzen mast. The mainmast was square-rigged after the European style. Special polaccas were used by Murat Reis, whose ships had lateen sails in front and fore-and-aft rig behind.

Some polacca pictures show what appears to be a ship-rigged vessel (sometimes with a lateen on the mizzen) with a galley-like hull and single-pole masts. Thus, the term "polacca" seems to refer primarily to the masting and possibly the hull type as opposed to the type of rig used for the sails. Two-masted polaccas were referred to as brig-polaccas with square sails on both masts. Three-masted polaccas were called ship-polaccas or polacca-settees.

Captain Jack Aubrey in HMS Sophie captures a French polacre laden with corn and general merchandise in Patrick O'Brian's first Aubrey-Maturin novel, Master and Commander (1969).

References

External links
Polacras (Spanish)

Sailboat types
Tall ships